The 2021 Rugby League World Cup Group B may refer to:
 2021 Men's Rugby League World Cup Group B
 2021 Women's Rugby League World Cup Group B
 2021 Wheelchair Rugby League World Cup Group B

See also 
 2021 Rugby League World Cup (disambiguation)